The Lloyd Sabaudo was a Shipping transport line formed in Turin in 1906. It began passenger service in 1907, expanding to link Italy to ports in Asia as well as North and South America. In 1932 it merged with several other Italian shipping lines to form the Italian Line.

History
As the Company was established in Turin in 1906, it starting its service route from, Genoa, to Naples, to New York route, by 1907 it started a passenger service From Genoa to Buenos Aires.

After the positive outcome for the Italian shipping companies of the Mediterranean Conference in Florence in 1906, some leading investors decided to enter passenger traffic to the Americas. The most important shipping company born as a result of this agreement was Lloyd Sabaudo, founded in 1906 with registered office in Turin and home port in Genoa where the operational offices of the company were located. The birth of this company created not a few discontent in the Ligurian shipowning class and, in particular, at Navigazione Generale Italiana which immediately understood that the new company would have made a ruthless competition.

In 1912, the headquarters were moved from Turin to Genoa and in 1913 a branch, "Marittima Italiana" was established to manage services to the Near East, the Red Sea, East Africa, India and the Far East. In 1919 a new connection service from the Black Sea and the Eastern Mediterranean to New York was started which was soon abandoned due to intense competition from other companies.

In 1932 the company was forced to merge with the Cosulich Line and the Navigazione Generale Italiana, to form the Italian Line.

Some Ships of the Lloyd Sabaudo

Gallery

References

External links
 Italian Steamship Lines History and Ephemera Including Lloyd Sabaudo GG Archives

Transport companies established in 1906
Defunct shipping companies
Defunct transport companies of Italy
Defunct cruise lines
Transatlantic shipping companies
Economic history of Italy
Transport companies disestablished in 1932
Italian companies established in 1906
1932 disestablishments in Italy
1932 mergers and acquisitions
Shipping companies of Italy